Lagoa Cove (Enseada da Lagoa) or Lagoa Beach (Praia da Lagoa in Portuguese, lit. "Lagoon Beach") is an extensive crescent-shaped maritime beach of  Póvoa de Varzim, Portugal.

Lagoa Cove is located near Novotel Vermar, and there are beach bars all year-long, namely Bar da Praia and other bars. The beach is very popular in the summer, but very calm during winter. The beach has white sand and no or very few rocks, during low tide, some immerse rocks become islets.

References

Beaches of Póvoa de Varzim
Coves
Bays of Portugal